Glide High School (GHS) is a public high school in Glide, Oregon, United States. Glide offers numerous hands-on, career and college entry classes.

July 2008 fire
On July 11–12, 2008, a fire destroyed one of the school's main buildings, which held the science lab, classrooms, the home economics area, and the library.  Many classrooms, offices, the gymnasium, and a weight room were saved by firefighters from the Glide Volunteer Fire department and other nearby companies. The school district was already replacing or rehabilitating some of the areas to have classrooms ready for the fall 2008 term, which began in September. The fire was believed to be caused by a plumber's torch in a classroom of the main building.

Academics
In 2020, 99% of the school's seniors received a high school diploma.

References

High schools in Douglas County, Oregon
Educational institutions established in 1952
Public high schools in Oregon
1952 establishments in Oregon